John Percy Herringshaw (22 May 1892 – 13 November 1974) was an English cricketer.  Herringshaw was a left-handed batsman who bowled slow left-arm orthodox.  He was born at Derby, Derbyshire.

Herringshaw made his first-class debut for Essex against Northamptonshire in the 1921 County Championship.  He made eight further first-class appearances for the county, the last of which came against Surrey in the 1922 County Championship.  He scored a total of 94 runs in these nine matches at an average of 10.44, with a high score of 18.  With the ball, he took 9 wickets at a bowling average of 55.33, with best figures of 2/48.

He died at Yapton, Sussex on 13 November 1974.

References

External links
John Herringshaw at ESPNcricinfo
John Herringshaw at CricketArchive

1892 births
1974 deaths
Cricketers from Derby
English cricketers
Essex cricketers
People from Yapton